Cycling Australia Hall of Fame was established in 2015. The focus of the  Hall of Fame is on athletic performance but also acknowledge administrators, officials and coaches. A ‘Legends of the sport’ category will be introduced three years after 2015.

Selection
The inaugural Selection Committee comprised: Peter Bartels (chair), Kate Bates, Rob Eva, Matthew Keenan, Michael Turtur, John Trevorrow and Anna Wilson

There are two categories:

Athlete - An athlete cannot be considered for inclusion into the Hall of Fame until after a two-year period following retirement from competition at the highest level. Athletes must be Australian citizens; achieved at the highest level of competition in their chosen discipline; and
have the support of their peers.

General - Administrator, official or coach can be considered for inclusion by providing no less than twenty years of service to the sport; served on Australian teams as a coach or administrator, coached a rider or riders to medal at Olympic Games, Commonwealth Games, World Championships, World Cups, WorldTour races or World Record/s;, made a significant and enduring positive contribution to the development of cycling and its standing in the community; and officiated at Olympic Games, Commonwealth Games, World Championships, World Cups or WorldTour races.

Inductees

References

External links
Cycling Australia Awards and Honours

Cycling in Australia
Australian sports trophies and awards
Awards established in 2015
Halls of fame in Australia
Cycling museums and halls of fame